Dick Tracy vs. Crime, Inc. (1941) is a Republic Movie serial based on the Dick Tracy comic strip. It was directed by the team of William Witney and John English with Ralph Byrd reprising his role from the earlier serials.  It was the last of the four Dick Tracy serials produced by Republic, although Ralph Byrd went on to portray the character again in two features and on television.

Plotline
Dick Tracy and his allies find themselves up against a villain known as The Ghost, with the impossible ability of becoming invisible.

Cast

Main cast
Ralph Byrd as Dick Tracy
Michael Owen as Bil Carr
Jan Wiley as June 'Eve' Chandler
John Davidson as Lucifer
Ralph Morgan as J.P. Morton/the Ghost

Supporting Cast
Kenneth Harlan as Police Lt Cosgrove
John Dilson as Henry Weldon
Howard C. Hickman as Stephen Chandler
Robert Frazer as Daniel Brewster
Robert Fiske as Walter Cabot
Jack Mulhall as Jim Wilson
Hooper Atchley as Arthur Trent
Anthony Warde as John Corey
Chuck Morrison as Trask
Forrest Taylor as Netzikoff's Butler

Production
Dick Tracy vs. Crime, Inc. cost $175,919 (a $1,380 overspend).

It was filmed between 17 September and 24 October 1941 under the working titles Dick Tracy Strikes Again and Dick Tracy's Revenge.  The serial's production number was 1097.

The scenes of giant waves hitting New York were recycled from the RKO Pictures film Deluge.

Cliffhangers
Most of the cliffhangers were stock footage from previous Dick Tracy serials.  However, the reuse of the highlights of previous Dick Tracy serials actually added to this serial, making it seem like a "best of" compilation.

Release

Theatrical
Dick Tracy vs. Crime, Inc.'''s official release date is 27 December 1941, during Christmas week 1941, although this is actually the date the seventh chapter was made available to film exchanges.

The serial was re-released on 8 October 1952, under the title Dick Tracy vs. Phantom Empire, between the first runs of Zombies of the Stratosphere and Jungle Drums of Africa.

VCI released the serial on 2 DVD discs in 2008. It was later released together with the other three Dick Tracy serials in a boxed DVD set by VCI in 2013.

Critical reception
Cline states that the Dick Tracy serials were "unexcelled in the action field," adding that "in any listing of serials released after 1930, the four Dick Tracy adventures from Republic must stand out as classics of the suspense detective thrillers, and the models for many others to follow."  He goes on to describe Dick Tracy vs. Crime, Inc. as one of the most outstanding of all serials.

This was a popular serial when first released, and in the opinion of Harmon and Glut, the best of the Dick Tracy serials.

Chapter titles
The Fatal Hour (28 min 12s)The Prisoner Vanishes (16 min 51s)Doom Patrol (16 min 52s)Dead Man's Trap (16 min 44s)Murder at Sea (16 min 41s)Besieged (16 min 42s)Sea Racketeers (16 min 58s)Train of Doom (16 min 48s)Beheaded (16 min 46s)Flaming Peril (16 min 58s)Seconds to Live (16 min 41s)Trial by Fire (16 min 41s)The Challenge (16 min 45s)Invisible Terror (16 min 40s)Retribution (16 min 43s)Source:

See also
 List of film serials by year
 List of film serials by studio
 Dick Tracy - Earlier serial (1937)
 Dick Tracy Returns - Earlier serial (1938)
 Dick Tracy's G-Men'' - Earlier serial (1939)

References

External links

Dick Tracy vs. Crime Inc. at Todd Gault's Movie Serial Experience

1941 films
American black-and-white films
1940s English-language films
Republic Pictures film serials
Dick Tracy films
Films directed by William Witney
Films directed by John English
1940s crime films
1940s police procedural films
Films with screenplays by Joseph F. Poland
Films about invisibility
1940s American films